Prajna Bhatta (16th century) was a historian who wrote Rajvalipataka that gives a historical account of Kashmir from the time of Zayn al-Abidin to the time of its incorporation in the dominions of the Mughal emperor Akbar in 1586.

References

16th-century Indian historians
History of Kashmir